GURPS In Nomine is the GURPS (third edition) adaptation of the In Nomine role-playing game.

Contents
GURPS In Nomine involves powerful angels and demons as player characters.

It contains conversion material for the core rules as well as selected supplemental rules, and is actually longer than the original book by sixteen pages, or one signature. It also includes information about the Grigori and their resonance, as well as the Fallen Grigori (also known as Skulkers), which has not yet appeared in the original line. The conversion guidelines in the back can convert both to and from GURPS and the original system.

The character point values for Celestial characters in GURPS In Nomine are very high in relation to most other GURPS settings.  Starting characters can easily exceed 800 points, and more experienced characters are likely to exceed 1500 points.

Publication history
The book was written by Elizabeth McCoy and Walter Milliken.

Steve Jackson Games supported its In Nomine role-playing game for four years before releasing GURPS In Nomine in 2000, at which point the company no longer supported other role-playing games besides GURPS.

Reception

Reviews
Backstab #24

References

External links
 Official site

Contemporary role-playing games
Dark fantasy role-playing games
Fantasy role-playing games
In Nomine
Role-playing game supplements introduced in 2000